Isaac James MacCollum (August 18, 1889 – March 4, 1968) was an American physician and politician from Wyoming, in Kent County, Delaware. He was a member of the Democratic Party who served as the 11th Lieutenant Governor of Delaware.

Early life and family
MacCollum was born at Fenwick Island, Delaware. He graduated from West Chester Normal School, now known as West Chester University in 1910 and Jefferson Medical College in Philadelphia in 1914.

Professional and political career
MacCollum served on the medical advisory board during World War I and was president of the Delaware State Medical Society in 1930. He served as a member of the trustees at Delaware State Hospital for nine years, president of the State Board of Health for four years, and a member of the State Parole Board for 20 years, 16 of those years as president.

He was elected Lieutenant Governor of Delaware in 1940, defeating Republican candidate Earle D. Willey, Jr. of Dover, who was a Judge of the Court of Common Pleas. He served from January 21, 1941 until January 19, 1945, alongside Republican Governor Walter W. Bacon. In 1944 he ran for Governor against Bacon, but was defeated and returned to his medical practice full-time.

Death and legacy
MacCallum died in Wyoming, Delaware. He was a respected country doctor, described as "mainly just a kind, traditional doctor. He made house calls, which is something you don't see today. I am grateful to him -- he delivered my first baby."

Almanac
Elections are held the first Tuesday after November 1. U.S. Representatives take office January 3 and have a term of two years.

External links
Delaware’s Lieutenant Governors 
Political Graveyard 
Something You Don't See Today -- House Calls

Places with more information
Delaware Historical Society; website; 505 North Market Street, Wilmington, Delaware 19801; (302) 655-7161
University of Delaware; Library website; 181 South College Avenue, Newark, Delaware 19717; (302) 831-2965

1889 births
1968 deaths
People from Kent County, Delaware
American healthcare managers
Delaware Democrats
Lieutenant Governors of Delaware
Burials in Kent County, Delaware
20th-century American politicians
Physicians from Delaware
West Chester University alumni
Jefferson Medical College alumni